The Black Angel or Black Angel may refer to:

Films
 The Black Angel (1942 film), a 1942 Mexican film by Juan Bustillo Oro
 Black Angel (1946 film), an American crime film noir
 Black Angel (1978 film), an action-thriller film
 Black Angel (1980 film), a short film
 Black Angel, an alternative title for the 1989 film Italian film Arabella Black Angel
 The Black Angel, the English name given to two films, Kuro no tenshi Vol. 1 (1997) and Kuro no tenshi Vol. 2 (1999), by Takashi Ishii

Music
 Black Angel (album), a 1998 album by British soul singer Mica Paris
 The Black Angel (album), a 1970 album by Freddie Hubbard
 "Black Angel", a song by Tom Robinson, on the 1979 album TRB Two

Literature
 The Black Angel (novel), a 1943 novel by Cornell Woolrich
 The Black Angel, a 2005 novel by John Connolly

Statues
 Black Angel, a 1913 statue in Oakland Cemetery
 Ruth Anne Dodge Memorial, a Daniel Chester French sculpture in Council Bluffs, Iowa

People
 Robledo Puch (born 1952), also known as The Black Angel, Argentine serial killer

See also 
 Black Angels (disambiguation)